Brahmans occupy the highest ritual position among the four Varnas of Hinduism. Since the Late Vedic period the Brahmins, who were generally classified as priests, mentor, teacher who were also rulers, zamindars, warriors and holders of other highest administrative posts.

Regiments 
Due to their martial abilities, Brahmans were described as 'the oldest martial community',

 1st Brahmans
 3rd Brahmans
 Peshwai, Peshwas were Brahmin and were the De facto rulers of Maratha Empire

Dynasties 

 Aryacakravarti Dynasty which was Ruled By Tamil Brahmins
 Baghochia Dynasty was founded By Raja Bir Sen and were the ruling Dynasty of Hathwa Raj and Bans Gaon Estate. The Cadet branch of the Family also Ruled Tamkuhi Raj, Salemgarh Estate, Ledo Gadi, Kiajori estate and Kharna Ghatwali.Bhumihar dynasty
 Bhurshut Dynasty was a medieval Hindu Dynasty spread across what is now Howrah and Hooghly districts in the Indian state of West Bengal;which was Ruled By a Royal Brahmin Family
 Brahman Dynasty of Sindh was founded By Chach of Alor, later Ruled By Chandar of Sindh and Raja Dahir
 Kabul Shahi Dynasty belonged to Bali clan of Mohyal Brahmin
 Kadamba Dynasty (345 – 525 CE) was a Dynasty that Ruled Northern Karnataka and the Konkan from Banavasi in present-day Uttara Kannada district
 Kanva Dynasty replaced the Shunga Empire in Magadha and Ruled in the Eastern regions of India
 Karnat dynasty, Ruled by Bikauwa Brahmins
 Oiniwar Dynasty, based in Mithila were Maithil Brahmins
 Pallava Dynasty {c.285 -905 CE} was a Tamil brahmin of bharadwaj gotra (Tamil Samaṇar Dynasty),  Pallavas Ruled Andhra (Krishna-Guntur) and North and Central Tamil Nadu. Appar is traditionally credited with converting the Pallava king, Mahendravarman to Saivaism.
 Parivrajaka Dynasty Ruled parts of Central India during the 5th and 6th centuries. The kings of this Dynasty bore the title Maharaja, and probably Ruled as feudatories of the Gupta Empire. The royal Family came from a Lineage of Brahmins of Bharadwaj Gotra.
 Patwardhan Dynasty was an Indian Dynasty established By the Chitpavan Brahmin Patwardhan Family
 Satavahana Dynasty - 230bc to 250ad In present day part of Madhya Pradesh, Gujrat, Maharashtra, Telangana, Rajasthan, Northern Karnataka etc
 Sena dyansty, Ruled by Brahmakshatriya
 Shunga Empire of Magadha was established By Pushyamitra Shunga
 Vakataka Dynasty was a Dynasty from the Indian subcontinent that is believed to have extended from the southern edges of Malwa and Gujarat in the North to the Tungabhadra River in the South as well as from the Arabian Sea in the West to the edges of Chhattisgarh in the East

States and Zamindari estates 

 Arni Estate of Madras Presidency - Ruled By Deshastha Brahmins
 Aundh State, Ruled By Deshasthas Brahmins
 Banaili Estate of Bihar - Ruled By Chaudhary Bahadhur Lineage - (Maithil Brahmins)
 Baudh State was a princely state Ruled By a Brahmin Family who adopted as successor a nephew of the Raja of Keonjhar
 Benares State, a 13 gun salute (15 gun salute local) state Ruled By Bhumihar Brahmins
 Bettiah Raj Ruled By Bhumihar Brahmins
 Bhawal Estate of Bengal - Ruled By Choudhary Lineage - (Shrotriya Brahmin)
 Bhor State, a 9 gun Salute princely state Ruled By Deshasthas Brahmins
 Chaube Jagirs were a group of five feudatory princely states of Central India during the period of the British Raj. which were Ruled By different branches of Brahmin Family.
 Darbhanga Raj of Mithila, Bihar - Ruled By Maithil Brahmins
 Dighapatia Raj of Bengal - Ruled By Roy Lineage - (Varendra Brahmins)
 Gaurihar State of Madhya Pradesh Ruled By Deshasthas Brahmins
 Ichalkaranji Estate of the British Raj - Ruled By Joshi Family - (Chitpavan Brahmins)
 Jalaun State of Bundelkhand region Ruled By a Deshasthas Brahmins
 Jamkhandi State Ruled By Chitpavans Brahmins
 Jhansi State Ruled By Newelkar House of Karhades Brahmins
 Kurundvad Senior and Kurundvad Junior states were rulered By Patwardhan clan of Chitpavans Brahmins
 Miraj Junior and Miraj Senior states were Ruled By Chitpavans Brahmins
 Muktagacha Raj of Bengal - Ruled By Chowdhary Lineage - (Varendra Brahmins)
 Nadia Raj of Bengal - Ruled By Roy or Ray Lineage - (Kulin Brahmins)
 Natore Raj of Bengal - Ruled By Roy Lineage - (Varendra Brahmin)
 Panth-Piploda Province a province of British India Ruled By a Deshasthas Brahmins
 Panyam Zamindari of Madras Presidency - Ruled By Deshastha Brahmins
 Rajshahi Raj of Bengal - Ruled By Rajshahi Family - (Varendra Brahmins)
 Ramdurg State Ruled By Chitpavans Brahmins
 Sangli State, an 11 gun Salute princely state Ruled By Chitpavans Brahmins
 Tekari Raj of Bihar - Ruled By Bhumihar Brahmins
 Vishalgad Estate of the British Raj - Ruled By Pant Prathinidhi Family - (Deshastha Brahmins)
 Yelandur Estate of Mysore Kingdom - Ruled By Madhwa Brahmin Family.
 Zamindari of Ratangarh (Bijnore) Ruled By Taga Rao Zokha Singh Tyagi Atri - He was a former commander (or Rao) of the northern branch of the Maratha Confederate Army, whose control ranged to the Tarai baselands of the Himalayas, Family of Chaudhry Lineage - Tyagi Gaur Brahmins

References

Brahmins
Brahmanas
Brahmin